Ann Marvet is an Estonian botanist. She is an editor of the journal Estonian Nature and a member of the Estonian Commission for Nature Conservation.

In 2008 she was made a member of the Order of the White Star, third class.

References

21st-century Estonian botanists
1939 births
Living people
Scientists from Tartu
20th-century Estonian women scientists
21st-century Estonian women scientists
Recipients of the Order of the White Star, 3rd Class
20th-century Estonian botanists